Ross Cooper "Rip" Hawkins (April 21, 1939 – July 28, 2015) was a professional American football player. He played five seasons in the National Football League with the Minnesota Vikings. He died in 2015; at the time of his death, he had Lewy body dementia.

References

External links
 

1939 births
2015 deaths
American football linebackers
Minnesota Vikings players
North Carolina Tar Heels football players
Western Conference Pro Bowl players
People from Winchester, Tennessee
Players of American football from Tennessee
Deaths from dementia in Wyoming
Deaths from Lewy body dementia